Grant County is a county in the U.S. state of West Virginia. As of the 2020 census, the population was 10,976. Its county seat is Petersburg. The county was created from Hardy County in 1866 and named for Civil War General Ulysses S. Grant.

History

The territory that became Grant County in 1866 was originally part of Hampshire County, the oldest county formed within the present boundaries of West Virginia, in 1754.  In 1786, Hardy County was formed from the southern portion of Hampshire County.  The county's boundaries were relatively stable from 1788 until 1866, when Grant County was formed from the western portion of Hardy.  The first counties formed in the state following the admission of West Virginia to the Union were Grant and Mineral in 1866, the latter formed from the western portion of Hampshire County, and thus adjoining Grant.  They were the fifty-first and fifty-second counties in West Virginia, and only Lincoln, Summers, and Mingo were created after them.

Beginning in 1863, West Virginia's counties were divided into civil townships, with the intention of encouraging local government.  This proved impractical in the heavily rural state, and in 1872 the townships were converted into magisterial districts.  Between its establishment and 1870, Grant County was divided into three townships: Grant, Milroy, and Union, which became magisterial districts in 1872.

Most of the 47 people killed in the 1985 Election day floods were in Pendleton and Grant counties, according to the National Weather Service.  At Franklin, the Pendleton County seat, the South Branch of the Potomac River crested at 22.6 feet during the incident. Flood stage in the shallow riverbed was only 7 feet.

Geography

Major highways

 U.S. Route 48
 U.S. Route 50
 U.S. Route 220
 West Virginia Route 28
 West Virginia Route 42
 West Virginia Route 55
 West Virginia Route 93

Adjacent counties
Mineral County (northeast)
Hardy County (east)
Pendleton County (south)
Randolph County (southwest)
Tucker County (west)
Preston County (northwest)
Garrett County, Maryland (northwest)

National protected areas
Monongahela National Forest (part)
Spruce Knob–Seneca Rocks National Recreation Area (part)

Demographics

2000 census
As of the census of 2000, there were 11,299 people, 4,591 households, and 3,273 families living in the county.  The population density was 24 people per square mile (9/km2).  There were 6,105 housing units at an average density of 13 per square mile (5/km2).  The racial makeup of the county was 98.33% White, 0.67% Black or African American, 0.26% Indigenous American, 0.14% Asian, 0.02% Pacific Islander, 0.13% from other races, and 0.45% from two or more races.  0.55% of the population were Hispanic or Latino of any race.

There were 4,591 households, out of which 30.20% had children under the age of 18 living with them, 59.50% were married couples living together, 8.20% had a female householder with no husband present, and 28.70% were non-families. 24.50% of all households were made up of individuals, and 11.30% had someone living alone who was 65 years of age or older.  The average household size was 2.43 and the average family size was 2.87.

In the county, the population was spread out, with 22.70% under the age of 18, 7.80% from 18 to 24, 27.50% from 25 to 44, 26.80% from 45 to 64, and 15.30% who were 65 years of age or older.  The median age was 39 years. For every 100 females there were 97.70 males.  For every 100 females age 18 and over, there were 94.50 males.

The median income for a household in the county was $28,916, and the median income for a family was $33,813. Males had a median income of $24,796 versus $18,354 for females. The per capita income for the county was $15,696.  About 12.60% of families and 16.30% of the population were below the poverty line, including 21.00% of those under age 18 and 18.70% of those age 65 or over.

2010 census
As of the 2010 United States census, there were 11,937 people, 4,941 households, and 3,435 families living in the county. The racial makeup of the county was 97.7% white, 0.7% black or African American, 0.2% Asian, 0.2% American Indian, 0.5% from other races, and 0.9% from two or more races. Those of Hispanic or Latino origin made up 1.0% of the population. In terms of ancestry, 26.9% were German, 15.0% were American, 9.3% were Irish, and 5.3% were English.

Of the 4,941 households, 29.3% had children under the age of 18 living with them, 56.3% were married couples living together, 8.3% had a female householder with no husband present, 30.5% were non-families, and 25.7% of all households were made up of individuals. The average household size was 2.39 and the average family size was 2.84. The median age was 44.0 years.

The median income for a household in the county was $35,593 and the median income for a family was $46,193. Males had a median income of $35,000 versus $24,643 for females. The per capita income for the county was $19,358. About 10.6% of families and 12.9% of the population were below the poverty line, including 15.0% of those under age 18 and 12.8% of those age 65 or over.

Communities

City
Petersburg (county seat)

Town
Bayard

Magisterial districts
Grant
Milroy
Union

Unincorporated communities

Arthur
Bismarck
Cabins
Dobbin
Dorcas
Fairfax
Forman
Gormania
Greenland
Henry
Hopeville
Lahmansville
Maysville
Medley
Mount Storm
Old Arthur
Scherr
Williamsport
Wilsonia

Politics
Politically, Grant County was historically a major outlier in West Virginia. While the rest of the state did not become a Republican bastion until the 21st century after having leaned heavily Democratic between the New Deal and Bill Clinton’s presidency, Grant County has always been among the most strongly Republican counties in the country. Since Grant County was created in 1866, no Democrat has managed to receive 40 percent of the county's vote in any Presidential election, even in national Democratic landslides. The only Republican to ever lose Grant County has been William Howard Taft in 1912 when the GOP was divided and Progressive Theodore Roosevelt claimed the majority of the county's vote.

As a measure of how powerfully Republican Grant County has been over the years, Franklin Delano Roosevelt never tallied more than 26.8 percent of the vote in any of his four successful campaigns, and Lyndon Johnson only managed 37.8 percent in 1964. Jimmy Carter is the only other Democrat to have cracked the 30 percent barrier.  However, at the state level, Grant County voted for popular Democratic governor Joe Manchin over his GOP opponent Russ Weeks by over 20 points in 2008.

Notably, in 2016 and 2020, Donald Trump received the highest percentage of the vote ever cast for a presidential candidate in this county, holding Democratic candidates Hillary Clinton and Joe Biden to 10% and 11% of the vote, respectively.

See also
National Register of Historic Places listings in Grant County, West Virginia

References

External links

Grant County - Gateway to the Potomac Highlands
Grant County Chamber of Commerce
Grant County Press
Grant County Development Authority
Grant County Schools
Grant County Historical/Genealogy Society, Inc.
WVGenWeb Grant County

 
Northwestern Turnpike
West Virginia counties on the Potomac River
1866 establishments in West Virginia
Populated places established in 1866
Counties of Appalachia